Digitaria insularis is a species of grass commonly known as sourgrass. It is native to Central and South America and the southern parts of the United States and has been introduced into other parts of the world. It was first described by the German botanist Friedrich Karl Georg Fedde in 1904.

Description

Digitaria insularis is a tufted perennial  bunchgrass with very short, swollen rhizomes. The stems reach a height of 80–130 cm and are erect, branched from the lower and middle nodes, swollen bases, with woolly bracts, glabrous internodes and nodes. Sheaths papillose - pilose in their majority, ligule 4–6 mm long, blades linear, 20–50 cm long and 10–20 mm wide. Inflorescence 20–35 cm long, numerous clusters, 10–15 cm long, solitary triquetrous rachis of clusters, 0.4-0.7 mm wide, scabrous; spikelets lanceolate, 4.2-4.6 mm long, paired, caudate, densely covered with trichomes up to 6 mm long, brown or whitish, ranging up to 5 mm from the apex of the spikelet; lower glume triangular to ovate, to 0.6 mm long, enervate, membranous; upper glume 3.5-4.5 mm long, acute, 3-5 nerved, ciliated; inferior lemma as long as spikelet, acuminate, 7-nerved, covered with silky hairs, upper lemma 3.2-3.6 mm long, acuminate, dark brown; anthers 1-1.2 mm long.

Distribution and habitat
Digitaria insularis is native to the tropical and sub-tropical Americas.

In its native Brazil, Paraguay, Bolivia and Venezuela it is a pervasive weed out of its natural habitats. It has been introduced in tropical Asia and some Pacific islands and elsewhere.  In some countries into which it has been introduced such as Hawaii and Papua New Guinea, it is considered an invasive species.

References

This article contains material translated from the Spanish Wikipedia.

insularis
Bunchgrasses of North America
Bunchgrasses of South America
Flora of Central America
Grasses of Argentina
Grasses of Brazil
Neotropical realm flora